Young Man with a Horn (also known as Miles Davis, Vol. 1) is the second 10-inch LP studio album by jazz musician Miles Davis. It was released through Blue Note Records in March 1953. The recording was made at the WOR studios in New York in May 1952.

Overview
The album was recorded at a time in his career while he was struggling with heroin addiction. This was the first of three 10"LPs recorded by Davis for Blue Note in the early 1950s. Davis says in his autobiography that his contract for Prestige Records, for whom he had recorded his first LP the year before, was non-exclusive, but elsewhere he states the initial Prestige contract was for only one year.

All cuts were initially issued as singles except "How Deep Is the Ocean". The recordings were re-released on 12 inch LPs in 1956 after Davis won the Down Beat readers poll as best trumpeter. The original master takes were split and merged with Davis' two other sessions for Blue Note (Miles Davis Volume 1 and Volume 2).

Release in Europe
Young Man with a Horn was also released by Vogue in France and the UK. The LP was reissued in its original form as 10" LP in Japan in 1999 (Toshiba-EMI) and in 2009 by the American audiophile Classic Records.

Track listing

Personnel
 Miles Davis – trumpet
 Jay Jay Johnson – trombone (omitted on tracks A3 and B3)
 Jackie McLean – alto saxophone (omitted on tracks A3 and B3)
 Gil Coggins – piano (credited on album cover as '"Gil" Coggins')
 Oscar Pettiford – bass
 Kenny Clarke – drums

References

1953 albums
Miles Davis albums
Blue Note Records albums